The haptophytes, classified either as the Haptophyta, Haptophytina or Prymnesiophyta (named for Prymnesium), are a clade of algae.

The names Haptophyceae or Prymnesiophyceae are sometimes used instead. This ending implies classification at the class rank rather than as a division. Although the phylogenetics of this group has become much better understood in recent years, there remains some dispute over which rank is most appropriate.

Characteristics

The chloroplasts are pigmented similarly to those of the heterokonts, but the structure of the rest of the cell is different, so it may be that they are a separate line whose chloroplasts are derived from similar red algal endosymbionts.

The cells typically have two slightly unequal flagella, both of which are smooth, and a unique organelle called a haptonema, which is superficially similar to a flagellum but differs in the arrangement of microtubules and in its use.  The name comes from the Greek hapsis, touch, and nema, round thread.  The mitochondria have tubular cristae.

Significance

The best-known haptophytes are coccolithophores, which make up 673 of the 762 described haptophyte species, and have an exoskeleton of calcareous plates called coccoliths. Coccolithophores are some of the most abundant marine phytoplankton, especially in the open ocean, and are extremely abundant as microfossils, forming chalk deposits.  Other planktonic haptophytes of note include Chrysochromulina and Prymnesium, which periodically form toxic marine algal blooms, and Phaeocystis, blooms of which can produce unpleasant foam which often accumulates on beaches.

Haptophytes are economically important, as species such as Pavlova lutheri and Isochrysis sp. are widely used in the aquaculture industry to feed oyster and shrimp larvae. They contain a large amount of polyunsaturated fatty acids such as docosahexaenoic acid (DHA), stearidonic acid and alpha-linolenic acid. Tisochrysis lutea contains betain lipids and phospholipids.

Classification

The haptophytes were first placed in the class Chrysophyceae (golden algae), but ultrastructural data have provided evidence to classify them separately. Both molecular and morphological evidence supports their division into five orders; coccolithophores make up the Isochrysidales and Coccolithales. Very small (2-3μm) uncultured pico-prymnesiophytes are ecologically important.

Haptophytes was discussed to be closely related to cryptomonads.

Haptophytes are closely related to the SAR clade.

Subphylum Haptophytina Cavalier-Smith 2015 [Haptophyta Hibberd 1976 sensu Ruggerio et al. 2015]
 Clade Rappemonada Kim et al. 2011
 Class Rappephyceae Cavalier-Smith 2015
 Order Rappemonadales
 Family Rappemonadaceae
 Clade Haptomonada (Margulis & Schwartz 1998) [Haptophyta Hibberd 1976 emend. Edvardsen & Eikrem 2000; Prymnesiophyta Green & Jordan, 1994; Prymnesiomonada; Prymnesiida Hibberd 1976; Haptophyceae Christensen 1962 ex Silva 1980; Haptomonadida; Patelliferea Cavalier-Smith 1993]
 Class Pavlovophyceae Cavalier-Smith 1986 [Pavlovophycidae Cavalier-Smith 1986]
 Order Pavlovales Green 1976
 Family Pavlovaceae Green 1976
 Class Prymnesiophyceae Christensen 1962 emend. Cavalier-Smith 1996 [Haptophyceae s.s.; Prymnesiophycidae Cavalier-Smith 1986; Coccolithophyceae Casper 1972 ex Rothmaler 1951]
 Family †Eoconusphaeraceae Kristan-Tollmann 1988 [Conusphaeraceae]
 Family †Goniolithaceae Deflandre 1957
 Family †Lapideacassaceae Black, 1971
 Family †Microrhabdulaceae Deflandre 1963
 Family †Nannoconaceae Deflandre 1959
 Family †Polycyclolithaceae Forchheimer 1972 emend Varol, 1992
 Family †Lithostromationaceae Deflandre 1959
 Family †Rhomboasteraceae Bown, 2005
 Family Braarudosphaeraceae Deflandre 1947
 Family Ceratolithaceae Norris 1965 emend Young & Bown 2014 [Triquetrorhabdulaceae Lipps 1969 - cf Young & Bown 2014]
 Family Alisphaeraceae Young et al., 2003
 Family Papposphaeraceae Jordan & Young 1990 emend Andruleit & Young 2010
 Family Umbellosphaeraceae Young et al., 2003 [Umbellosphaeroideae]
 Order †Discoasterales Hay 1977
 Family †Discoasteraceae Tan 1927
 Family †Heliolithaceae Hay & Mohler 1967
 Family †Sphenolithaceae Deflandre 1952
 Family †Fasciculithaceae Hay & Mohler 1967
 Order Phaeocystales Medlin 2000
 Family Phaeocystaceae Lagerheim 1896
 Order Prymnesiales Papenfuss 1955 emend. Edvardsen and Eikrem 2000
 Family Chrysochromulinaceae Edvardsen, Eikrem & Medlin 2011
 Family Prymnesiaceae Conrad 1926 ex Schmidt 1931
 Subclass Calcihaptophycidae
 Order Isochrysidales Pascher 1910 [Prinsiales Young & Bown 1997]
 Family †Prinsiaceae Hay & Mohler 1967 emend. Young & Bown, 1997
 Family Isochrysidaceae Parke 1949 [Chrysotilaceae; Marthasteraceae Hay 1977]
 Family Noëlaerhabdaceae Jerkovic 1970 emend. Young & Bown, 1997 [Gephyrocapsaceae Black 1971]
 Order †Eiffellithales Rood, Hay & Barnard 1971 (loxolith; imbricating murolith)
 Family †Chiastozygaceae Rood, Hay & Barnard 1973 [Ahmuellerellaceae Reinhardt, 1965]
 Family †Eiffellithaceae Reinhardt 1965
 Family †Rhagodiscaceae Hay 1977
 Order Stephanolithiales Bown & Young 1997 (protolith; non-imbrication murolith)
 Family Parhabdolithaceae Bown 1987
 Family †Stephanolithiaceae Black 1968 emend. Black 1973
 Order Zygodiscales Young & Bown 1997 [Crepidolithales]
 Family Helicosphaeraceae Black 1971
 Family Pontosphaeraceae Lemmermann 1908
 Family †Zygodiscaceae Hay & Mohler 1967
 Order Syracosphaerales Ostenfeld 1899 emend. Young et al., 2003 [Rhabdosphaerales Ostenfeld 1899]
 Family Calciosoleniaceae Kamptner 1927
 Family Syracosphaeraceae Lohmann, 1902 [Halopappiaceae Kamptner 1928] (caneolith & cyrtolith; murolith)
 Family Rhabdosphaeraceae Haeckel, 1894 (planolith)
 Order †Watznaueriales Bown 1987 (imbricating placolith)
 Family †Watznaueriaceae Rood, Hay & Barnard 1971
 Order †Arkhangelskiales Bown & Hampton 1997
 Family †Arkhangelskiellaceae Bukry 1969
 Family †Kamptneriaceae Bown & Hampton 1997
 Order †Podorhabdales Rood 1971 [Biscutales Aubry 2009; Prediscosphaerales  Aubry 2009] (non-imbricating or radial placolith)
 Family †Axopodorhabdaceae Wind & Wise 1977 [Podorhabdaceae Noel 1965]
 Family †Biscutaceae Black, 1971
 Family †Calyculaceae Noel 1973
 Family †Cretarhabdaceae Thierstein 1973
 Family †Mazaganellaceae Bown 1987
 Family †Prediscosphaeraceae Rood et al., 1971 [Deflandriaceae Black 1968]
 Family †Tubodiscaceae Bown & Rutledge 1997
 Order Coccolithales Schwartz 1932 [Coccolithophorales]
 Family Reticulosphaeraceae Cavalier-Smith 1996 [Reticulosphaeridae]
 Family Calcidiscaceae Young & Bown 1997
 Family Coccolithaceae Poche 1913 emend. Young & Bown, 1997 [Coccolithophoraceae]
 Family Pleurochrysidaceae Fresnel & Billard 1991
 Family Hymenomonadaceae Senn 1900 [Ochrosphaeraceae Schussnig 1930]

References

External links 

Algal taxonomy

Bikont phyla